Graham Barrett (born 6 October 1981) is an Irish former footballer who played as a forward. He began his footballing career at Arsenal, where he won the FA Youth Cup.

Barrett went on to feature for English clubs Bristol Rovers, Crewe Alexandra, Colchester United and Brighton & Hove Albion. He also appeared for Coventry City and Sheffield Wednesday. Barrett as well had spells with Scottish sides Livingstone, Falkirk and St Johnstone. He then joined up with Irish outfit Shamrock Rovers, with whom he won a League of Ireland championship medal. Barrett also played as an international for the Republic of Ireland's national football team.

Club career

Arsenal
Born in Dublin, Ireland, Barrett signed professional terms with Arsenal in October 1998. He made his debut for the Gunners as a late substitute for Thierry Henry in a 3–0 victory at Leicester City in December 1999 He also featured as a substitute in their 4–1 win over Sunderland the following month.

Having already won the 1998 UEFA Under-16 Championship with Ireland, Barrett then captained Arsenal's youth team to win the 2000 FA Youth Cup. During one of the final's two legs he received the man of the match award. Following such Gunners' manager Arsène Wenger encouraged Barrett  to go out on loan to gain some experience. As so he joined up with club Bristol Rovers in December 2000. However he played just 20 minutes under Ian Holloway, and was diagnosed with glandular fever thus losing a stone in weight and spending six-months on the sidelines.

During the 2001–02 season, Barrett again went out on loan, this time to Crewe Alexandra, where he made three appearances in his month-long loan stint. He then returned to Arsenal before Wenger agreed to allow him to join Colchester United on loan in December 2001. Barrett quickly became a fan favorite at the club, in scoring a brace during a 3–2 win against Northampton Town on Boxing Day 2001. These were his first goals in professional football in only his third game with the U's. Barrett then netted a further two goals in 20 games for Colchester, but an injury suffered during a 0–0 draw with Wycombe Wanderers curtailed the rest of his season. As a mark of respect, United fans dressed in green in their final home game of the season, in a nod to Barrett's Irish roots. Colchester manager Steve Whitton thus sought to have Barrett back at Layer Road for the following season. With this being said he opted to go to Brighton & Hove Albion on a season-long loan deal. Prior to joining Brighton he made his full international debut for Ireland in August 2002. This came after having made 24 appearances for the under-21s and representing Ireland at every age group since turning 15. He also scored in a pre-season friendly for Arsenal against Stevenage. With Brighton, Barrett managed to attain 20 league starts, making a further ten appearances as a substitute, but again suffered a series of niggling injuries that held back his progress. At Brighton he also scored once against Sheffield United.

Coventry City
Barrett was released from Highbury in May 2003, joining Coventry City on a three-year deal on 30 May. Barrett's injury problems continued while with the Sky Blues, where he made 32 league starts and made 23 substitute appearances in two seasons, scoring six goals. He joined Sheffield Wednesday on the loan deadline day in March 2005, where he scored once against Torquay United in six appearances. Barrett was told by manager Micky Adams that he was free to leave the club despite having one year remaining on his contract. Despite this he remained at Coventry, but, out of the first-team picture, went on loan to Scotland with Livingston. He played just six games for the club before suffering a season-ending knee injury.

Falkirk
Signing a two-year with Scottish side Falkirk following his release from Coventry in August 2006, with the Bairns' medical staff satisfied with his rehabilitation after his serious knee injury the previous season. Once again though, Barrett suffered further injuries, requiring an operation on his knee in October 2006. He returned to action for the 2007–08 season, going on to sign a one-year contract extension in March 2008. After three operations and later being informed that his injury had been misdiagnosed, Barrett left Falkirk after manager John Hughes sat him down and told him he would never be the player he was before suffering his injuries. He was released from the club in January 2009. He had scored eight goals in 48 league games at the Falkirk Stadium.

St Johnstone
After going on trial with Heart of Midlothian, St Johnstone stepped in to sign Barrett after Hearts decided against handing him a deal. He was brought in to cover a spate of injuries amongst St Johnstones' forwards in February 2009. After nine appearances and one goal against Airdrieonians, Barrett was released by the club in the summer of 2009.

Shamrock Rovers
Barrett returned to his native Ireland with Shamrock Rovers in August 2009. In his two seasons with the club, he amassed 21 appearances and scored once, but he still struggled with persistent injuries, holding him back from progressing and making a greater number of appearances. He finally had to admit defeat in the 2010 season, playing his last game in July 2010, meaning he could not play a part in the chase for the League of Ireland title. His manager at Rovers, Michael O'Neill, advised Barrett to assess his options, warning that he would "need to be careful and think about a few years' time." As The Hoops went on to take the League of Ireland title, Barrett was still eligible for a league winners medal.

International career
Barrett represented the Republic of Ireland since the age of 15. He was a part of  the Irish side which won the 1998 UEFA European Under-16 Football Championship in Scotland. He went on to play eleven under-18 games for Ireland, scoring four goals. 

Barrett then scored on his senior debut for Ireland in a 3–0 victory over Finland.

Career statistics

Club

International

International goals

Personal life
Having grown up close to Tallaght, Barrett followed his father, Gary, in playing for Shamrock Rovers. Gary began his playing career with Shamrock Rovers in 1980 under Johnny Giles, where he scored a number of goals. This factor was a draw to Graham when joining the club himself in 2009.

Honours

Club
Arsenal
FA Youth Cup: 2000

Shamrock Rovers
League of Ireland Premier Division: 2010

International
Republic of Ireland
UEFA European Under-16 Football Championship: 1998

All honours referenced by:

References

Ireland v Italy programme 12/11/2021

External links
 
 

1981 births
Living people
Association footballers from Dublin (city)
Republic of Ireland association footballers
Association football forwards
Expatriate footballers in England
Expatriate footballers in Scotland
Republic of Ireland expatriate association footballers
Republic of Ireland international footballers
Republic of Ireland under-21 international footballers
Arsenal F.C. players
Bristol Rovers F.C. players
Crewe Alexandra F.C. players
Colchester United F.C. players
Brighton & Hove Albion F.C. players
Coventry City F.C. players
Sheffield Wednesday F.C. players
Livingston F.C. players
Falkirk F.C. players
St Johnstone F.C. players
Shamrock Rovers F.C. players
Premier League players
English Football League players
Scottish Premier League players
Scottish Football League players
League of Ireland players